The following is a list of awards and nominations received by Scottish actor Ewan McGregor.

Major awards

Golden Globe Awards

Primetime Emmy Awards

Screen Actors Guild Awards

Audience awards

Golden Schmoes Awards
0 wins of 1 nomination

Kids' Choice Awards
0 wins of 1 nomination

MTV Movie + TV Awards
1 wins of 8 nominations

Teen Choice Awards
0 wins of 1 nomination

Critics associations awards

Awards Circuit Community Awards 
0 wins of 2 nomination

Chicago Film Critics Association Awards
0 wins of 1 nomination

Critics Choice Television Awards
1 win of 1 nomination

Detroit Film Critics Society Awards
0 wins of 1 nomination

Film Critics Circle Australia Awards
0 wins of 1 nomination

Nevada Film Critics Society Awards 
1 win of 1 nomination

Online Film & Television Association Awards 
2 wins of 4 nominations

Phoenix Film Critics Society Awards 
0 wins of 2 nominations

Seattle Film Critics Awards
0 win of 1 nomination

St. Louis Film Critics Association Awards
1 win of 1 nomination

Washington DC Area Film Critics Association Awards
0 wins of 1 nomination

Film festival awards

Capri-Hollywood Film Festival Awards
1 win of 1 nomination

Hamburg Film Festival Awards
0 wins of 1 nomination

Hollywood Film Festival Awards
2 wins of 2 nominations

San Sebastian International Film Festival Awards
1 win of 2 nominations

International awards

Australian Film Institute Awards
0 wins of 1 nomination

BAFTA Scotland Awards
2 wins of 3 nominations

BAFTA/LA Britannia Awards
1 win of 1 nomination

British Independent Awards
1 win of 2 nominations

CinEuphoria Awards 
0 wins of 1 nomination

Empire Awards
5 wins of 6 nominations

European Film Awards
2 wins of 2 nominations

Evening Standard British Film Awards
0 wins of 1 nomination

Golden Camera Awards
1 win of 1 nomination

Goya Awards
0 wins of 1 nomination

Irish Film and Television Awards
0 wins of 1 nomination

London Critics Circle Film Awards
1 win of 3 nominations

Order of Arts and Letters France Awards
1 win of 1 nomination

Miscellaneous awards

20/20 Awards 
0 wins of 1 nomination

Blockbuster Entertainment Awards
0 wins of 1 nomination

Gotham Awards
1 win of 1 nomination

IF Awards
0 wins of 1 nomination

Satellite Awards
2 wins of 4 nominations

Saturn Awards
0 wins of 3 nominations

Village Voice Film Poll Awards
0 wins of 1 nomination

References

McGregor, Ewan